Madinani is a town in north-western Ivory Coast. It is a sub-prefecture of and the seat of Madinani Department in Kabadougou Region, Denguélé District. Madinani is also a commune.

In 2014, the population of the sub-prefecture of Madinani was 25,054.

Villages
The 18 villages of the sub-prefecture of Madinani and their population in 2014 are:

References

Sub-prefectures of Kabadougou
Communes of Kabadougou